Magnentiini is a tribe of leafhoppers in the subfamily Deltocephalinae. There are currently 2 genera and 4 species in the tribe. It was formerly placed in the subfamily Nioniinae, but was moved to Deltocephalinae based on anatomical similarities. Members of Magnentiini are superficially similar to members of Punctulini and Vartini.

Genera 
There are currently two genera in Magnentiini:

 Magnentius Singh-Pruthi, 1930
 Ndua Linnavuori, 1978

References 

Deltocephalinae